Marko Miševski (born 23 August 1999) is a Macedonian handball player for RK Vardar 1961 and the North Macedonia national team.

He represented North Macedonia at the 2020 European Men's Handball Championship.

Honors
 Macedonian Handball Super League
 Winner:2019,2021, 2022
 Macedonian Handball Cup
 Winner:2021, 2022
 EHF Champions League 
 Winner :  2018–19
 SEHA League
 Winner : 2018–19
 IHF Super Globe
 Third place: 2019

References

External links

1999 births
Living people
Macedonian male handball players
Sportspeople from Skopje
Expatriate handball players
Macedonian expatriate sportspeople in France
RK Vardar players